Naima Ramos-Chapman is an American director, writer, and actress. She directed two short films that deal with gender-based violence, And Nothing Happened in 2016, and Piu Piu in 2018.

Life and career 
Ramos-Chapman was raised in Flatbush, Brooklyn. She is of Puerto Rican and Black descent. She studied dance from childhood and attended the Alvin Ailey School for Dance. Ramos-Chapman graduated from Brooklyn College.

The first film Ramos-Chapman wrote and directed was the 2016 short And Nothing Happened. She used Kickstarter and worked several jobs to finance the film. The film, which she stars in, was inspired by her trauma in the aftermath of a sexual assault. She stated in an interview with Essence, "It is not only a thing one person survives–sexual assault is something a whole family, community, nation survives and until we understand that we cannot truly confront it. That is why I made And Nothing Happened." In 2018, Ramos-Chapman wrote and directed Piu Piu, a "psycho surrealist" short that premiered at the 2018 BlackStar Film Festival. Piu Piu is loosely based on an experience Ramos-Chapman had been stalked by a stranger in public.

Ramos-Chapman is a writer, director, and actor for HBO's Random Acts of Flyness. She also edits and does production work for the series.

On July 24, 2019, it was announced that Ramos-Chapman was slated to direct a Showtime series called How to Make Love to a Black Woman (Who May Be Working Through Some Sh*t), executive produced by Lena Waithe and written by Casallina “Cathy” Kisakye. In February 2020, it was announced that Showtime would no longer move forward with the pilot.

In 2021, Ramos-Chapman was named a United States Artists (USA) Fellow.

Personal life

References

External links 

Official website

Year of birth missing (living people)
Living people
21st-century American women writers
American women film directors
21st-century American actresses
African-American directors
African-American actresses
Puerto Rican film directors
American people of Puerto Rican descent
Filmmakers from New York (state)
People from Flatbush, Brooklyn
Brooklyn College alumni
American women film producers
21st-century African-American women writers
21st-century African-American writers